Han Sang-hyuk may refer to:

 Han Sang-hyeok (voice actor)
 Hyuk (singer)